The 2015–16 Austrian Hockey League season began on 11 September 2015 and ended on 12 April 2016. EC Red Bull Salzburg defended their title, beating Orli Znojmo 4-2 in the finals.

Standings

Regular season

Placement round

Qualification round

Playoffs

References

External links 

Erste Bank Eishockey Liga Statistics

Austrian Hockey League seasons
Aus
1
2015–16 in Slovenian ice hockey
2015–16 in Italian ice hockey
2015–16 in Czech ice hockey
2015–16 in Hungarian ice hockey